Torresina is a comune (municipality) in the Province of Cuneo in the Italian region Piedmont, located about  southeast of Turin and about  east of Cuneo.

Torresina borders the following municipalities: Igliano, Murazzano, Paroldo, and Roascio.

Demographic evolution

References

External links
 www.comune.torresina.cn.it/

Cities and towns in Piedmont
Comunità Montana Valli Mongia, Cevetta e Langa Cebana